A Philosophical Essay on Probabilities is a work by Pierre-Simon Laplace on the mathematical theory of probability. The book consists of two parts, the first with five chapters and the second with thirteen.

Table of Contents
Part I - A Philosophical Essay on Probabilities
Introduction
Concerning Probability
General Principles of the Calculus of Probability
Concerning Hope
Analytical Methods of the Calculus of Probability
Part II - Application of the Calculus of Probabilities
Games of Chance
Concerning the Unknown Inequalities which may Exist among Chances Supposed to be Equal
Concerning the Laws of Probability which result from the Indefinite Multiplication of Events
Application of the Calculus of Probabilities to Natural Philosophy
Application of the Calculus of Probabilities to the Moral Sciences
Concerning the Probability of Testimonies
Concerning the Selections and Deliberations of Assemblies
Concerning the Probability of the Judgements of Tribunals
Concerning Tables of Mortality, and the Mean Durations of Life, Marriage and Some Assemblies
Concerning the Benefits of Institutions which Depend on the Probability of Events
Concerning Illusions in the Estimation of Probabilities
Concerning the Various Means of Approaching Certainty
Historical Note of the Calculus of Probabilities to 1816

References

External links

A Philosophical Essay on Probabilities at Project Gutenberg
A Philosophical Essay on Probabilities at Internet Archive

History of probability and statistics
Probability books
1814 documents
19th-century essays
Pierre-Simon Laplace